Roberto Sajeva (born 29 March 1985 in Palermo) is an Italian politician, editorial director of the cultural-political journal Mondoperaio. Sajeva has been national secretary of the Federazione dei Giovani Socialisti.

References

1985 births
21st-century Italian politicians
Living people
Politicians from Palermo